Baron Bálint Balassi de Kékkő et Gyarmat (20 October 155430 May 1594) was a Hungarian Renaissance lyric poet. He wrote mostly in Hungarian, but was also proficient in eight more languages: Latin, Italian, German, Polish, Turkish, Slovak, Croatian and Romanian.  He is the founder of modern Hungarian lyric and erotic poetry.

Life
Balassi was born at Zólyom in the Captaincy of Cisdanubia and Mining Towns in the Kingdom of Hungary (today Zvolen, Slovakia). He was educated by the reformer Péter Bornemisza and by his mother, the highly gifted Protestant zealot, Anna Sulyok.

His first work was a translation of Michael Bock's Wurlzgertlein für die krancken Seelen, (published in Kraków), to comfort his father while in Polish exile. On his father's rehabilitation, Bálint accompanied him to court, and was also present at the coronation diet in Pressburg (today's Bratislava), capital of Royal Hungary in 1572. He then joined the army and fought the Turks as an officer in the fortress of Eger in North-Eastern Hungary. Here he fell violently in love with Anna Losonczi, the daughter of the captain of Temesvár, and evidently, from his verses, his love was not unrequited. But after the death of her first husband she gave her hand to Kristóf Ungnád.

Naturally Balassi only began to realize how much he loved Anna when he had lost her. He pursued her with gifts and verses, but she remained true to her pique and to her marriage vows, and he could only enshrine her memory in immortal verse.

In 1574 Bálint was sent to the camp of Gáspár Bekes to assist him against Stephen Báthory; but his troops were encountered and scattered on the way there, and he himself was wounded and taken prisoner. His not very rigorous captivity lasted for two years, during which he accompanied Báthory where the latter was crowned as King of Poland. He returned to Hungary soon after the death of his father, János Balassi.

In 1584 he married his cousin, Krisztina Dobó, the daughter of the valiant commandant, István Dobó of Eger. This became the cause of many of his subsequent misfortunes. His wife's greedy relatives nearly ruined him by legal processes, and when in 1586 he turned Catholic to escape their persecutions they slandered him, saying that he and his son had embraced Islam. His desertion of his wife and legal troubles were followed by some years of uncertainty, but in 1589 he was invited to Poland to serve there in the impending war with Turkey. This did not take place and after a spell in the Jesuit College of Braunsberg, Balassi, somewhat disappointed, returned to Hungary in 1591. In the 15 years war he joined the Army, and died at the siege of Esztergom-Víziváros the same year as the result of a severe leg wound caused by a cannonball. He is buried in Hybe in today's Slovakia.

Balassi's poems fall into four divisions: hymns, patriotic and martial songs, original love poems, and adaptations from the Latin and German. They are all most original, exceedingly objective and so excellent in point of style that it is difficult even to imagine him a contemporary of Sebestyén Tinódi Lantos and Péter Ilosvay. But his erotics are his best productions. They circulated in manuscript for generations and were never printed until 1874, when Farkas Deák discovered a perfect copy of them in the Radványi library. For beauty, feeling and transporting passion. there is nothing like them in Magyar literature until we come to the age of Mihály Csokonai Vitéz and Sándor Petőfi. Balassi was also the inventor of the strophe which goes by his name. It consists of nine lines a a b c c b d d b, or three rhyming pairs alternating with the rhyming third, sixth and ninth lines.

Family tree
The family tree of the Balassi family:

Literary award
The Balint Balassi Memorial Sword Award is an annual Hungarian literary award founded by Pal Molnar in 1997, and presented to an outstanding Hungarian poet, and to a foreign poet for excellence in translation of Hungarian literature, including the works of Balassi.

See also

Balassi Institute
Balint Balassi Memorial Sword Award
Pal Molnar, founder of the Balint Balassi Memorial Sword Award

References

External links
 Homepage of Balassi Sword www.balassi.eu

Hungarian male poets
Hungarian erotica writers
Hungarian nobility
1554 births
1594 deaths
People from Zvolen
16th-century Hungarian poets